Massandra or Masandra is an urban-type settlement in the Yalta Municipality in Crimea.

Occupying the spot of an ancient Greek settlement (Tavrida-Ταυρίδα), Masandra was acquired by Counts Potocki in 1783.

In the mid-19th century, it passed to Prince Vorontsov Jr, whose father was the governor of New Russia. Enraptured by a picturesque setting, Vorontsov in 1881 engaged a team of French architects to design for him a château in the Louis XIII style. He died the following year and construction work was suspended until 1889, when the messuage was purchased by Alexander III of Russia. The tsar asked architect Maximilian Messmacher to finish the palace for his own use but he did not live to see it completed in 1900. 
During the Soviet years, the palace was employed by Joseph Stalin as his dacha.

Today, Masandra is known for its viniculture and production of dessert and fortified wines. The Massandra Winery was founded by Prince Lev Golitsyn in 1894. The enoteca of the winery contains about one million bottles of wine.

A minor planet, 3298 Massandra, discovered in 1979 by N. Chernykh at Nauchnyj, is named after the settlement.

See also
 Euxinograd near Varna, the site of a similar seaside château, commissioned by Ferdinand I of Bulgaria

References

External links
 Masandra Palace Photoalbum
 

Urban-type settlements in Crimea
Official residences in Russia
Official residences in Ukraine
Seaside resorts in Russia
Seaside resorts in Ukraine
Yalta Municipality
Wine regions of Russia
Wine regions of Ukraine
Presidential residences
Official residences